Green Lanes is a main road in North London which forms part of the A105 road.

History
Whilst it is undeniably an ancient thoroughfare, the age and origin of Green Lanes is somewhat uncertain. It possibly originated as a drovers' road along which cattle were walked from Hertfordshire to London. Its origins may date back as far as the Roman period.

Route
Green Lanes runs from Newington Green north along the western edge of Stoke Newington, thereby forming the border between Hackney and Islington, until it reaches Manor House at the eastern edge of Finsbury Park. As it crosses the New River over Green Lanes Bridge, it enters the London Borough of Haringey, it then runs  through the neighbourhood of Harringay. From the junction with Turnpike Lane the road temporarily changes its name and runs for  through Wood Green as 'High Road', resuming its Green Lanes identity again after the junction with Lascott's Road. It then continues north for another  through Palmers Green and Winchmore Hill in the London Borough of Enfield, until it reaches the junction with Ridge Avenue and Green Dragon Lane at Mason's Corner. The northward continuation into Bush Hill at this point is now blocked.

Sights

Amongst the sights along its route are:
 Clissold Park
 The former Engine House of Metropolitan Water Board, 
 Finsbury Park
 The New River (which follows a roughly parallel course to Green Lanes for much of its distance)
 Sites of the now demolished Harringay Stadium and Harringay Arena.
 Railway Fields Nature Reserve
 The Salisbury Public House
 Turnpike Lane Underground Station
 Haringey Civic Centre. The facility was built in 1958 and listed in 2018. 
 The “Round House” or “Mushroom House”, built in 1822 as the gatehouse for Chitts Hill House it now stands in Woodside Park (Wood Green, London)

Continuous segregated cycle lanes run north from the A406 North Circular to the end of Green Lanes and on to Enfield Town. These were installed following a successful bid by Enfield Council for Mini Holland funding from Transport for London.

Demography
See:
 Demographics in Stoke Newington
 Demographics in Harringay
 Demographics in Wood Green
 Demographics in Palmers Green
 Demographics in Winchmore Hill

Neighbourhoods

Neighbourhoods sited on Green Lanes, from South to North:
 Newington Green
 Stoke Newington
 Manor House
 Harringay (including Finsbury Park)
 Duckett's Green
 Wood Green
 Palmers Green 
 Winchmore Hill

References

External links

 

Streets in the London Borough of Enfield
Streets in the London Borough of Hackney
Streets in the London Borough of Haringey
Streets in the London Borough of Islington